Planet finder may refer to:

 Terrestrial Planet Finder, a NASA project for a telescope system to detect extrasolar terrestrial planets
 Automated Planet Finder, a telescope at Lick Observatory, California